Nikino is a rural locality (a village) in Solikamsky District, Perm Krai, Russia. The population was 23 as of 2010. There are 3 streets.

Geography 
Nikino is located 50 km northwest of Solikamsk (the district's administrative centre) by road. Kasib is the nearest rural locality.

References 

Rural localities in Solikamsky District